Barry Fanaro is an American screenwriter of television and feature films. He has taught screenwriting seminars at USC, UCSB, AFI and Mercer University.

Early life
Fanaro graduated magna cum laude with a dual major from Mercer University, Macon Georgia. He also has an MFA from NYU's Tisch Graduate School of Film and Television. In the early 80s he was a performing member of The Groundling's Improv Theater Group.

Career
Fanaro wrote and produced over 250 episodes, pilots and original series for network television.  He is best known for serving as writer/executive producer of The Golden Girls during its first four seasons.  He was nominated for four Emmys and won two Emmys for Outstanding Writing and Best Comedy Show, Producer. Fanaro was also nominated for two Writers Guild of America Awards and won for Best Writer in 1987. He has three Golden Globes for Best Comedy/Variety Show. In 1989, both Fanaro, along with partner Mort Nathan, and two alums from The Golden Girls, Kathy Speer and Terry Grossman had started KTMB Productions with a deal at Walt Disney Studios. Both Fanaro and Nathan moved to Paramount Television in 1992 to start Fanaro/Nathan Productions.

In the 1990s Fanaro turned his attention to feature films. His credits include Kingpin, The Crew, Men in Black II and I Now Pronounce You Chuck and Larry. He was also a sought after script doctor and selected production re-writes include Analyze This, Big Trouble, What's The Worst That Could Happen? From 2009–present he sold four original feature film scripts which are currently in development.

References

External links

Living people
American writers of Italian descent
American educators
American male screenwriters
American television writers
Screenwriting instructors
Emmy Award winners
American male television writers
Year of birth missing (living people)